A referendum on a war tax was held in Switzerland on 6 June 1915. Voters were asked whether they approved of amending the constitution to introduce a one-off war tax during the First World War, which Switzerland remained neutral. It was approved by a large majority of voters and all cantons, the first time a referendum had been passed in every canton.

Background
The referendum was a mandatory referendum, which required a double majority; a majority of the popular vote and majority of the cantons. The decision of each canton was based on the vote in that canton. Full cantons counted as one vote, whilst half cantons counted as half.

Results

References

1915 referendums
1915 in Switzerland
Referendums in Switzerland
Military reform referendums